Eucharist is a Swedish melodic death metal band, which released two albums in the 1990s, and a third in 2022.

History
Eucharist's first album, A Velvet Creation (1993), featured Markus Johnsson (vocals, guitar), Thomas Einarsson (guitar), Tobias Gustafsson (bass guitar), and Daniel Erlandsson (drums), while for the second, Mirrorworlds (1997), they were reduced to the trio of Johnsson, Erlandsson, and bass guitarist Martin Karlsson. One of numerous groups involved in establishing the very melodic style now known as the Gothenburg Sound, Eucharist did not fare particularly well in the face of the era's stiff competition, resulting in personnel eventually joining rival bands. Most notably, original bass guitarist Gustaffsson joined the power metal band Armageddon, and drummer Erlandsson worked for a time with Gothenburg scene leaders In Flames before settling in permanently with Arch Enemy.

Eucharist was founded in Veddige, a small city about 40 km from Gothenburg, Sweden, some time around 1989. A demo released in 1992 became a classic in the metal underground. It was titled Greeting Immortality. The same year, Obscure Plasma Records released the Greeting Immortality 7" (without the consent of the band), and in 1993 the band recorded a song named "The View" for a Deaf Records (Peaceville Records) compilation album called Deaf Metal Sampler. Afterwards, the band suddenly split up.

But soon after, Wrong Again Records asked them to re-unite and sign a deal, which they did. Eucharist entered the studio and recorded their first album A Velvet Creation, which was released in 1993, with the cover misprinted in the wrong color. In the summer of 1994, two songs, "Wounded and Alone" and "The Predictable End", were recorded for a compilation album released by Wrong Again Records entitled, W.A.R. Compilation vol 1, released in 1995.

Eucharist split up again and some members started playing in other bands. Erlandsson, for example, played drums on two tracks of In Flames' EP Subterranean. In 1996, Johnsson and Erlandsson started working with Eucharist again and they were instantly offered a deal by WAR Music (a new label risen from the ashes of Wrong Again Records) and the album, Mirrorworlds, released in 1997 was the result. But again, after a short tour in early 1998, Eucharist split up.

In 2001, A Velvet Creation was re-released on Regain Records on both CD and vinyl. This time remastered, and with the two songs from the W.A.R. Compilation session as bonus tracks. The cover was also printed in the correct color, but this time Markus Johnsson's name was misprinted as Marcus Johansson. In 2011 Mirrorworlds was released for the first time on vinyl by Wolfsbane records, including a limited edition version with a bonus 7" featuring 'The View' from 1993's Deaf Metal Sampler released by Deaf Records a sublabel of Peaceville.

As of April 2016, the band reunited with the original line up playing the first show in 18 years at Metal Reunion PTD3 festival at Sweden.

In 2022, the band's third album I Am the Void was released. This album shows a more melodic black metal sound, without completely sacrificing the band's death metal roots.

Discography

Studio albums
A Velvet Creation − 1993, 2001 (reissue)
Mirrorworlds − 1997, 2003 (reissue)
I Am the Void - 2022

EPs and demos
Rehearsal − 1991 (demo)
Greeting Immortality − 1992 (EP)
Demo '92 − 1992 (Demo)
A Velvet Creation − 1993 (demo)

References

External links
 Official Website

Swedish melodic death metal musical groups
Musical groups established in 1989
Musical groups disestablished in 1998